The Fushui River (富水) is a river flowing through Tongshan and Yangxin Counties in the south-eastern part of Hubei province, China.

It originates in the Mufu Mountains, flows in the general eastern direction, and discharges into the Yangtze River   near Fuchi Town, Yangxin County.

There are a number of dams on the river and its tributaries. The most major or them, the Fushui Dam (富水大坝) is located in Yangxin County just east of the Tongshan County's county line. The dam creates a fairly large Fushui Reservoir (富水水库).

The Xianning Nuclear Power Plant is under construction in Dafan Town, Tongshan County, on the northern shore of the  Fushui Reservoir; it is expected to use the reservoir's water for cooling and various ancillary purposes.

China National Highway 316 runs alongside the river for parts of its length.

References

External links

 湖北省富水水库管理局  (The administration of Fushui Reservoir, Hubei Province) – the official site 

Rivers of Hubei